Myristica gillespieana is a species of plant in the family Myristicaceae. It is endemic to Fiji.

References

Endemic flora of Fiji
gillespieana
Least concern plants
Taxonomy articles created by Polbot